Between Brothers (Swedish: Bröder emellan) is a 1946 Swedish comedy film directed by Börje Larsson and starring Max Hansen, Marianne Aminoff and Vibeke Falk. It was shot at the Centrumateljéerna Studios in Stockholm. The film's sets were designed by the art director Bertil Duroj.

Synopsis
After many years apart from each other, Peter returns from America and proceeds to steal his twin brother Patrik's identity while he is in the hospital.

Cast
 Max Hansen as Patrik Brodd / Peter Brodd
 Marianne Aminoff as 	Ingeborg Brodd
 Vibeke Falk as 	Birgit Sande
 Åke Grönberg as 	Bengtsson, driver
 John Botvid as Door-keeper at the hospital
 Hilda Borgström as 	Karin, maid
 Einar Axelsson as 	Fagerholm, banker
 Julia Cæsar as Door-keeper's wife
 Arthur Fischer as Perlman, lawyer
 Emy Hagman as 	Viola, maid
 Ragnar Widestedt as 	Doctor
 Maj-Lis Lüning as 	Elsa, nurse
 Inga-Bodil Vetterlund as 	Secretary
 Gerda Björne as 	Guest of Brodd 
 Alli Halling as 	Mrs. Fagerholm 
 Stig Johanson as 	Taxi Driver 
 Mimi Pollak as 	Miss Sande 
 Inga-Lill Åhström as 	Nurse 
 Brita Öberg as 	Miss Sande's cleaning-woman

References

Bibliography 
 Qvist, Per Olov & von Bagh, Peter. Guide to the Cinema of Sweden and Finland. Greenwood Publishing Group, 2000.

External links 
 

1946 films
Swedish comedy films
1946 comedy films
1940s Swedish-language films
Films directed by Börje Larsson
Swedish black-and-white films
1940s Swedish films